Žďár is a municipality and village in Jindřichův Hradec District in the South Bohemian Region of the Czech Republic. It has about 100 inhabitants.

Administrative parts
The hamlet of Malá Rosička is an administrative part of Žďár.

References

Villages in Jindřichův Hradec District